The Kulevi oil terminal is an oil port on the eastern Black Sea coast in Georgia. The terminal is located in Khobi District, close to the populated area of the village Kulevi, formerly Redoubt Kali, and from the coastal area between rivers Tsiva and Khobistskali.

Construction
The Kulevi Oil Terminal project was originally authorised by president Shevardnadze's decree on September 8, 1999. Subsequently, the construction began near the village of Kulevi by Terminal 2000 Ltd, a partnership created between Argomar Oil Ltd and Georgian Railway. In late 2002 though, the project was put on hold, due to environmental concerns and insufficient funds.  Construction resumed in September 2004 under an international consortium of investors led by a Georgian business tycoon Badri Patarkatsishvili. Two years later Badri Patarkatsishvili sold his stake in Kulevi Terminal, then still under construction, to the State Oil Company of Azerbaijan (SOCAR) for an undisclosed sum of money.

The terminal was complete by November 2007 and was officially opened on 16 May 2008.

Description
Kulevi Oil Terminal incorporates three piers, a canal for tankers, a mobile service fleet of 9 vessels, and a laboratory for oil and refined products testing. For loading operations there are two berths for receiving tankers with tonnage up to 100,000 tonnes. Loading performance is from 1,000 to 8,000 m3/h. The terminal has its own railway station, where 180 oil tank cars can be placed for discharging. The trestles make possible the simultaneous discharge of 168 oil tank cars, through four railway branches.

The terminal has annual processing capacity of 10 million tonnes of crude oil and refined products.  SOCAR plans to increase the capacity of the terminal to 20 million tonnes per year. That would make Kulevi the largest oil terminal in South Caucasus.

Ownership
The Kulevi oil terminal is owned and operated by the Black Sea Terminal Ltd., a subsidiary of the State Oil Company of Azerbaijan Republic.

See also
 List of ports in Georgia (country)

References

External links
 Official website

Ports and harbours of Georgia (country)
Transport in Georgia (country)
Oil terminals
Energy infrastructure in Georgia (country)
Petroleum in Georgia (country)